Kansas Coliseum was an entertainment complex in unincorporated Sedgwick County, Kansas, United States.  It was located north of Wichita at the intersection of I-135 and 85th Street North.

It hosted sporting events, concerts, shows, and consisted of four pavilions, an RV park, and the 9,686-seat Britt Brown Arena, named for Harry Britton (Britt) Brown Jr., of Wichita, the former owner of The Wichita Eagle newspaper. Arena capacity could be configured for up to 12,200 people.

History
Kansas Coliseum was opened in 1977. Two brass plaques (one located on the lower level, by the box office windows and the other up on the main concourse) read:

"Dedicated September 1978, for the promotion of agricultural, educational, and cultural benefits, on behalf of the people of the world, by the citizens of Sedgwick County, the board of the county commissioners, the Kansas State Park and Resources Authority, the Economic Development Administration and the Ozark Regional Commission of the United States Department of Commerce and the Kansas Coliseum Corporation."

It hosted NCAA Men's Basketball tournament first and second-round games in 1981 and 1994. The Wichita State University basketball teams played the 2002–03 season there while the Shockers' on-campus home, Charles Koch Arena, was undergoing major renovations.

It was the home of the now-defunct Wichita Wings indoor soccer team, who played in the MISL and NPSL between 1979 and 2001. The Kansas Coliseum was the home venue for the Wichita Stealth, Wichita Aviators, and Wichita Wild indoor/arena football teams between 2001 and 2008. It also was home to the Wichita Thunder ice hockey team that played in the Coliseum from 1992 to 2009. The Wichita Thunder now plays in the INTRUST Bank Arena in downtown Wichita, Kansas.

The last Wichita Thunder hockey game ever played at the Kansas Coliseum was on January 9, 2010, in front of a home crowd of 5,556.  The Thunder lost the game 3–1 to the Odessa Jackalopes.  Brent Ottmann would be the last Thunder player to score a goal in the building at 2:05 of the 1st period, and Kenny Bernard of Odessa scoring the last goal ever at 19:53 of the 3rd period.

The final event to take place inside the Arena was the RV and Boat show on February 20, 2010. On February 22, 2010, The Britt Brown Arena closed its doors. The arena ceased hosting events, while the neighboring Kansas Pavilions portion of the complex remained open until late 2016.

On January 10, 2012, the entire Coliseum complex was sold by Sedgwick County to aviation research developer Johnny Stevens for a sum of $1,462,487.12. The Britt Brown Arena was transformed into an aerospace testing facility for the National Institute for Aviation Research.

Events

Concerts

Other events
Monster Jam Thunder Nationals – January 13–15, 2006 and January 9–11, 2009

References

External links
Kansas Coliseum

Buildings and structures in Sedgwick County, Kansas
County government buildings in Kansas
Sports venues in Kansas
Basketball venues in Kansas
Defunct indoor soccer venues in the United States
Defunct indoor arenas in the United States
Defunct indoor ice hockey venues in the United States
Event venues established in 1977
Wichita State Shockers men's basketball
Wichita Thunder
1977 establishments in Kansas
Sports venues completed in 1977
2010 disestablishments in Kansas
Defunct college basketball venues in the United States
Indoor arenas in Kansas